FCK competed in the 2007–08 season in the Danish Superliga, Danish Cup, UEFA Champions League and UEFA Cup.

Competitions
In this season, F.C. Copenhagen participated in the Danish Superliga, Danish Cup, UEFA Champions League and UEFA Cup.

Danish Superliga

FCK's Superliga campaign began on 2007-07-18, when they played away at Farum Park against FC Nordsjælland. The match was equal, but in the added time of the second half, substituted Issey Nakajima-Farran scored the winning goal for the home team.

The second match was also away, against the UEFA Intertoto Cup winners, AaB. This time FCK also were down with a goal, but in the 75th minute, Brede Hangeland made it equal, 1–1.

After the unsuccessful beginning followed 7 victories and 4 draws before losing home to Randers FC on 2007-10-28. After a massive pressure from FCK, Kenneth Møller Pedersen scored on penalty kick for Randers in the end of first half, and although FCK had the most of the play, they were not able to score in the game.

FCK ended the autumn with 2 victories and 2 drawn matches, and when they drew against local rivals Brøndby IF in the last match of the autumn, took AaB the leading position of the league from FCK, who spend the winter placed 2nd.

In the autumn Copenhagen has been criticised for not scoring enough goals, when they were only able to score 23 times in 18 fights. That means 7 teams have scored more goals than FCK, who is equal with Brøndby IF on the ninth place.

The spring season began on 2008-03-16 with a 4–1 victory against Lyngby Boldklub at Lyngby Stadion.

The spring was disappointing for FCK as they lost 5 matches and drew two matches. A period from March 31 to April 27 was without any victories for the defending champions.

On May 15 was AaB guaranteed the championship. At the time was Copenhagen placed 2nd. Three days later waited the New Firm derby against Brøndby away from home. When FCK lost this match 1–2 and FC Midtjylland won 3–2 against AGF, Midtjylland took over the 2nd place.

FCK could still get the silver medal, if they won the last match of the season against Lyngby, while Midtjylland lost points against FC Nordsjælland. Although Copenhagen won 3–1, FC Midtjylland also won 3–0, and FCK ended with the bronze medals.

Danish Cup

In the Danish Cup FCK started in third round. Here they drew FC Fredericia from the 1st Division. The match was played on 2007-09-26 at Fredericia Ny Stadion. Aílton scored the first goal of the match after just 4 minutes, but only 14 minutes later made Fredericia's Rasmus Katholm it equal again. In second half Libor Sionko showed his qualities with two goals, which determined the match.

In the fourth-round draw, came the 2nd Division West side Varde IF up from the hat. This match was played on 2007-10-31 at Sydbank Stadion, where the most of Varde's stores closed, so the inhabitants could go to football. In the first half showed FCK their strength with 4 goals in 34 minutes, which determined the match.

On 2008-03-08 FCK faced the 1st Division team Næstved BK. This match was disfigured by spectator riots in the first half. The match on the pitch ended 2–0 to Copenhagen after two Brazilian goals by Aílton Almeida and José Júnior.

In the semifinals Copenhagen drew Esbjerg fB. The first match at Parken EfB won 1–0 on a goal by Michaël Murcy in the second half.

In the second leg scored Mathias "Zanka" for Copenhagen, in a match FCK dominated. In the extra time scored Jesper Bech for Esbjerg and Jesper Grønkjær for FCK. In the last minute of the extra time score Jesper Lange the goal, that sent EfB to the final. Manager Ståle Solbakken was so frustrated that he kicked some water bottles, which led to exclusion from the bench and a ban in the next Superliga match.

UEFA Champions League

In the UEFA Champions League was FCK seeded in the second qualifying round, where their campaign started. Here they drew Israeli Beitar Jerusalem. In the first match at Parken Stadium on 2007-07-31 won FCK 1–0 on a goal in the ninth minutes, by Marcus Allbäck, called the "international goalscorer", because of his many important goals in European matches.

In the return match at Teddy Stadium was exiting as Barak Yitzhaki scored for the home team, so the aggregate goal score was 1–1 as the 90 minutes had passed. This meant that the clash were going in extra time and again showed Allbäck his international strength as he scored the winning goal after just 7 minutes.

In the third qualifying round was S.L. Benfica drawn. FCK played also against Benfica in the 2006–07 season in the Champions League group stage. This time started FCK away at Estádio da Luz, but in defiance of a good effort Rui Costa did the evil to the Danes, when he scored twice, while Atiba Hutchinson scored for FCK.

To qualify for the group stage Copenhagen needed a 1–0 win at home in the second leg. FCK played a fabulous match, but when Kostas Katsouranis scored after 17 minutes for Benfica, was the European dream ended. By way of consolation entered the Danish champions the UEFA Cup first round.

UEFA Cup

F.C. Copenhagen entered the first round of the UEFA Cup as the best of the unseeded teams. Ironical they drew the team with the highest UEFA coefficient of the possible teams, RC Lens. The battle started on 2007-09-19 at Stade Félix-Bollaert and after just 5 minutes of play scored Marcus Allbäck an important away goal. Lens pressed the rest of the game and in second half scored Aruna Dindane for the home team to the score 1–1.

In the second leg scored Eric Carrière after just 14 minutes of play for RC Lens, but with fight, will and high morale succeeded FCK in coming back in the game by a Marcus Allbäck scoring in second half, and in the extra time scored Jesper Grønkjær on a penalty kick, after captain Michael Gravgaard was shown the red card.

In the group stage were FCK in group B with Panathinaikos F.C., FC Lokomotiv Moscow, Atlético Madrid and Aberdeen F.C. The match against Panathinaikos was played at Parken Stadium and although the big expectations to the home team, won the Greeks on a goal by Dame N'Doye. In the matched missed Hjalte Nørregaard a penalty kick.

The second match was away against Lokomotiv Moscow at Lokomotiv Stadium, who came to the group stage by knocking out fellow Danes, FC Midtjylland. In the match were Copenhagen dominating, but the victory was only secured by a penalty goal by Morten Nordstrand.

The last home match were against mighty Atlético Madrid, which showed quality as they won 2–0 against F.C. Copenhagen. After the match confessed the players of FCK that Atlético was at least one class better than themselves.

Although FCK only had scored a single goal in three matches could they qualify for the round of 32 by a draw against Aberdeen. The match at Pittodrie Stadium were a terrible experience for the Copenhagen players and fans, as they in second half were played out and lost 4–0. Especially Mikael Antonsson, who played instead of banned Brede Hangeland, were vilified after the match, as he were involved in all 4 goals – one of them were an own goal.

FCK ended fourth in the group, and as in the Superliga were they criticized for not scoring enough goals – 1 goal in 4 matches – and it was a penalty kick. F.C. Copenhagen were sent out of Europe.

Squads
The following squads, are lists with all the players, who have played in FC København in the 2007–08 season.

First team

Reserve team

Transfers

Players In

Players out

Competition statistics

Danish Superliga

Classification

Results summary

Results
Results for F.C. Copenhagen for season 2007–2008.

NOTE: scores are written FCK first

Key:
DSL = Danish Superliga
DC = Danish Cup
CLQ = UEFA Champions League Qualifier
UC1 = UEFA Cup 1st Round
UCB = UEFA Cup Group B
F = Friendly match

Report explanation
FCK in Danish
UEFA in English

Player statistics

Honours
Profile of the Year in the Superliga (2007): Jesper Grønkjær
Superliga Player of the Year (2007): Jesper Grønkjær
Manager of the Year (2007): Ståle Solbakken
The Autumn Profile (2007): Jesper Grønkjær
Danish Goalkeeper of the Year (2007): Jesper Christiansen
Team of the Year (Denmark) (2007): Jesper Christiansen, Jesper Grønkjær, Morten Nordstrand
Team of the Year (Norway) (2007): Brede Hangeland

See also
2007–08 Danish Superliga
2007–08 Danish Cup
2007–08 UEFA Champions League
2007–08 UEFA Cup

References

F.C. Copenhagen seasons
Copenhagen